Eswaran Ramar, known by his screen name Theni Eswar, is an Indian cinematographer who works mainly in Tamil cinema and Malayalam cinema.

Early life 
Eswar grew up in Theni completing his schooling and he graduated in diploma in automobile engineering. In his college days he took up photography, which led to a career. He went on to receive a Kodak Award for street photography. He spent most of his early life in Theni before moving to Chennai.

Film career 

Eswar moved to Chennai to start his career as a cinematographer.

He also shot the photographs for Vairamuthu novels including kallikattu ithigasam, Karuvaachi kaaviyam, and Tamizhatrupadai.

During his search for a job as an assistant cinematographer he collaborated with Baskar Sakthi, a writer in Ananda Vikatan who was at that time writing a series called "Route Bus" and was given the role of photographing the scenic routes of travel, places and the locals.

He shot the films Sivappathigaram, Kattradhu Thamizh, Vennila Kabadi Kuzhu and more. During the photoshoot of Vennila Kabadi Kuzhu, and director Suseenthiran hired him as a cinematographer for his next film Azhagarsamiyin Kuthirai. Then he collaborated with the directors Bala, Ram and Gowtham Menon. He worked with director Ram in the film Taramani which was his second venture and he is credited as an additional cinematographer in Gowtham Menon's movie Achcham Yenbadhu Madamaiyada.

He also shot Bala's movie Naachiyaar which released in 2018. Another film in which he worked with debutant director Lenin Bharathi titled Merku Thodarchi Malai which released in the same year. He won the Best Cinematographer Award in Norway Tamil Film Festival Awards and Bioscope film festival held in Punjab for that movie. He again collaborated with Ram in the movie Peranbu with actor Mammootty as the lead. The film was released in February 2019.

Filmography

Awards and nominations

References

External links 
</ref>

 https://m.imdb.com/name/nm4592116/
 https://siima.in/2019-nominations.php

Indian cinematographers
Cinematographers from Tamil Nadu
Tamil film cinematographers
Year of birth missing (living people)
Living people
People from Theni district